Nick Zano (born March 8, 1978) is an American actor. Zano is known for having played Vince in The WB's sitcom What I Like About You. He hosted MTV's former infotainment program about the film industry, Movie House, and briefly worked as an MTV News correspondent before he began an acting career. His recurring roles on television include Drew Pragin on Melrose Place, Pete on Happy Endings, P.J. Hillingsbrook on 90210, and Johnny on 2 Broke Girls. He also starred as a lead on the NBC sitcom One Big Happy as Arthur in the TV series Minority Report. He is best known as Dr. Nathaniel "Nate" Heywood / Steel in The CW Arrowverse, starring on Legends of Tomorrow.

Early life
Zano was born in Nutley, New Jersey. He lived in Florida as a child. While attending Wellington High School he was active in the drama and television departments. Throughout his junior and senior years, he and his classmates produced a weekly off-beat skit comedy show that aired on the school's television station. While working on the show, Zano also wrote, starred in and directed student films that made their way to the JVC Universal Film Competition, a festival in which over 800 local high schools participate.

Career
Shortly after graduating from high school, Zano moved to Hanover, Pennsylvania, and landed a job developing films and television projects for a small production company. During that time, he also was the associate producer for Living Position, a World AIDS Day television special hosted by Lou Diamond Phillips. While selling shoes in a trendy Los Angeles boutique, a customer went back to her office and told her supervisors she'd just met a man who would be a wonderful on-air personality. The woman was an employee at MTV, which led to Zano's hosting job of MTV News' Movie House. In 2003, he landed the role of Vince in The WB's sitcom What I Like About You, starring Amanda Bynes and Jennie Garth. Zano made his first appearance in the second season and remained until the fourth and final season, which ended March 24, 2006. Afterwards, he went on to host and executive produce his MTV reality show Why Can't I Be You?.

The following year, Zano appeared alongside Haylie Duff and Frankie Muniz in the independent romantic comedy My Sexiest Year. The film, which received mixed reviews, had its world premiere at the 2007 Hamptons International Film Festival. In 2008 he appeared in a supporting role opposite Drake Bell in MGM's teen comedy film College. Zano also appeared in Beverly Hills Chihuahua and Joy Ride 2: Dead Ahead later that year. In 2009, Zano co-starred in The Final Destination, the fourth installment of the Final Destination film series. He also guest starred on the ABC sitcom Cougar Town, starring Courteney Cox. In 2010, he had a recurring role on The CW's Melrose Place.

In 2011 he started a recurring role on 2 Broke Girls as Johnny, a graffiti artist who regularly flirts with Max (Kat Dennings). In 2011 he also co-starred in the romantic comedy Scents and Sensibility as Brandon. In 2012, Zano scored a recurring role on another CW series, 90210, in which he played a billionaire who goes into business with Annie (Shenae Grimes). On November 27, 2011, Zano starred as David Morretti in the ABC family Christmas themed movie Desperately Seeking Santa opposite Laura Vandervoort. Beginning in December 2012, Zano began a recurring role in season three of the ABC sitcom Happy Endings as Pete, Penny's new love interest.

In 2013, Zano appeared on Mom as Anna Faris' (main character's) boyfriend for two episodes.

In February 2014, Zano signed on to play the male lead in Liz Feldman and Ellen DeGeneres' NBC comedy pilot One Big Happy. The show centers on Lizzy (played by Elisha Cuthbert), a lesbian who gets pregnant just as her straight male best friend Luke (the father of the child), played by Zano, meets and marries the love of his life, Prudence. The show was ordered to series on May 9, 2014, and debuted  mid-season in early 2015. In 2015, Zano starred as Arthur, described as having a hard shell, borne of years of difficult experience in the outside world that Dash avoided, in the Fox drama Minority Report, based on the 2002 Steven Spielberg film of the same name.

From 2016 to 2022, Zano starred as Dr. Nate Heywood/Citizen Steel, a historian whose grandfather was the hero known as Commander Steel, a member of the Justice Society of America on The CW series Legends of Tomorrow. He starred on the show's latter six seasons, appearing in 94 episodes.

Personal life
Zano is in a long-term relationship with actress Leah Renee Cudmore. In July 2016, she gave birth to their son. Their second child, a daughter, was born in 2018.

Filmography

Film

Television

References

External links
 

1978 births
Living people
21st-century American male actors
American male film actors
American male television actors
American television reporters and correspondents
Male actors from Florida
Male actors from New Jersey
People from Nutley, New Jersey
People from Palm Beach County, Florida
People from York County, Pennsylvania